Susana Marcos Celestino (born September 25, 1970) is a Spanish physicist specialising in human vision and applied optics. She was the Director of the Optical Society in 2012.

Education 
Marcos studied at the University of Salamanca in her hometown and obtained an M.Sc. and then Ph.D. in Physics, which she was granted with a special award. After training as a fellow in the Conseyu Cimeru d'Investigaciones Científiques (CSIC), she had postdoctoral training in Europe and the United States.

Academic career 
Marcos Celestino's work focuses upon the development of diagnostic and correctional instruments in ophthalmology.

From 1993 to 1996, Celestino had a predoctoral fellowship in the Department of Vision and Physiological Optics at the Institute of Optics of the CSIC in Madrid, Spain. Celestino spent three years, from 1997 to 2000, as a postdoctoral researcher in Schepens Eye Research Institute of the Harvard University Medical School in Boston.

Celestino went back to Spain in 2000, getting a position at the CSIC, first as a senior scientist and later as a research professor. In 2005 she got the position of titular scientist of the CSIC, developing her own Institute of Optics. In 2006, she was awarded the position of professor of research at the CSIC, and in 2008 she was nominated director of the Institute of Optics "Daza de Valdés". She held this position until 2012.

Marcos Celestino was awarded the King Jaime Prize in New Technologies, the Physics, Innovation and Technology Prize of the Royal Spanish Society of Physics, the Adolph Lomb Prize of the Optical Society and the ICO Prize from the International Optics commission. In 2019, Marcos Celestino was awarded the 'Leonardo Torres Quevedo' National Award in the field of engineering.

Participation in professional societies 

 1999–2001. Vice President of the technical group Applications of Visual Science of The Optical Society.
 2001–2003. Chair of the Applications of Visual Science Technical Group of The Optical Society: vision and division of the colors.
2004-2008. President of the National Committee of Visual Science, Socieda Española de Óptica.
2003. President of the Department of Image and Vision, Optics Institute, CSIC.
2008. Member of the Physiological Optics and Visual Psychophysical Committee, Association for Research in Vision and Ophthalmology.
2009-2012 Director of the Optics Institute Daza de Valdés, CSIC.
2011 Faculty Madrid MIT M + Vision Consortium.
2012 Director of the Physics Center Miguel Ángel Catalán, CSIC.
2012 Director-at-large Optical Society of America.

Funding and scholarships 
Celestino was recipient of the following scholarships for research:

 1992 Beca del Consejo Cimeru de Investigaciones Científicas
 1993 Resarch Comunidá. University of Salamanca
 1997 she was awarded of a Fulbright postdoctoral fellowship
 1997-1999 fellowship for a long-term program on Human Rescue Science
 2001 scholarship for visiting professionals at University of Queensland

Patents 
Celestino patented several methods and elements that modify or improve optical deficiencies and with crucial advances in ophthalmology. This has been described as unusual for a Spanish scientist.

References 

21st-century Spanish scientists
1970 births
People from Salamanca
Fellows of Optica (society)
Academic staff of the University of Salamanca
University of Salamanca alumni
Spanish ophthalmologists
Spanish women physicists
21st-century women scientists
Living people
Women in optics
Ophthalmology
Spanish physicists
Spanish women scientists